Green Valley Township may refer to:

 Green Valley Township, Becker County, Minnesota
 Green Valley Township, Holt County, Nebraska
 Green Valley Township, Miner County, South Dakota, in Miner County, South Dakota
 Green Valley Township, Solano County, California

Township name disambiguation pages